Sultan Abu Bakar may refer to:

 Sultan Abu Bakar of Pahang
Sultan Abu Bakar of Johor
 Sultan Abu Bakar State Mosque, Johor Bahru, Malaysia, named after Sultan Abu Bakar of Johor